Pyroclastic Peak is the second highest of the five named volcanic peaks immediately south of Mount Cayley in British Columbia, Canada. It is part of the Pacific Ring of Fire that includes over 160 active volcanoes.

On the south ridge of Pyroclastic Peak is a feature known as The Vulcan's Thumb which remains unclimbed because of the looseness of the rock.

See also
 Cascade Volcanoes
 Mount Cayley
 Garibaldi Volcanic Belt
 Volcanism of Canada
 Volcanism of Western Canada
 List of volcanoes in Canada

References

Volcanoes of British Columbia
Garibaldi Volcanic Belt
Pyroclastic, Peak
Pacific Ranges
New Westminster Land District